A Groovy Situation is the fourth album by American organist Reuben Wilson recorded in 1970 and released on the Blue Note label. The CD reissue added one bonus track.

Reception
The AllMusic review by Stephen Thomas Erlewine awarded the album three stars and wrote, "With songs like this, there's no question that Wilson is going for a wide audience, and while these smooth, funky grooves will do nothing for jazz purists, it's an entertaining record, and some of the grooves are quite hot indeed".

Track listing
All compositions by Reuben Wilson except where noted
 "While the World Lies Waiting" – 5:13
 "Sweet Tooth" – 6:55
 "(If You Let Me Make Love to You Then) Why Can't I Touch You?" (Charles Courtney, Peter Link) – 6:20
 "A Groovy Situation" (Herman Davis, Russell R. Lewis) – 8:47
 "Happy Together" (Gary Bonner, Alan Gordon) – 5:32
 "Signed, Sealed, Delivered, I'm Yours" (Stevie Wonder, Lee Garrett, Syreeta Wright, Lula Mae Hardaway) – 6:20
 Recorded at Rudy Van Gelder Studio, Englewood Cliffs, New Jersey on September 18 (track 6) and September 25 (tracks 1-5), 1970.

Personnel
Reuben Wilson – organ
Earl Turbinton – alto saxophone
Eddie Diehl – guitar
Harold White – drums

References

Blue Note Records albums
Reuben Wilson albums
1970 albums
Albums recorded at Van Gelder Studio
Albums produced by Francis Wolff